Ptychopseustis pallidochrealis is a moth in the family Crambidae. It is found in Japan, where it has been recorded from Okinawa.

References

Cybalomiinae
Moths described in 2004